Isabel LaRosa (born 2004), is an American singer, songwriter and video director from Annapolis, Maryland. She signed to RCA Records in 2021 and released her debut EP, I'm Watching You, in 2022. She rose to prominence after releasing her 2022 single "I'm Yours", which went viral on the social media platform TikTok.

Early life 
LaRosa grew up with music around her from a young age. She attended jazz clubs with her father, where he played the saxophone, her brother would play the guitar and she would sing alongside them. LaRosa starting writing songs with her brother, Thomas, while she was in elementary school, which led them to form a creative duo. Thomas and Isabel write all of her music and Thomas produces it.

Career 
On September 8, 2021, Isabel LaRosa released her debut single "16 Candles". She released the following singles "Closer" and "Gameboy" in 2021.

On January 26, 2022, LaRosa released the single "Therapy". The following month she released the single "Haunted", which served as the lead single from her debut EP, I'm Watching You. The song was also released alongside her first music video, which served as the first part of a three part series which would come together to form a short film. The EP's second single, "Help", was released on April 15, 2022. The EP was released on June 24, 2022, alongside a short film which was written and co-directed by LaRosa herself. Another single, "Heartbeat" was released on August 26, 2022. LaRosa also cowrote three songs from label-mate Ari Abdul's EP, Fallen Angel. On October 28, 2022, LaRosa released the single "I'm Yours", which became her breakthrough song after going viral on TikTok. "I'm Yours" was released alongside a "sped up" version of the song, and a music video was released on November 11.  On December 13, it was announced that LaRosa would be the opening act for Nessa Barrett's Young Forever Tour.

Artistry 
LaRosa is very involved with the visual aspects of her career. She wrote the treatments and co-directed each visual for her debut EP, I'm Watching You. The music video for "I'm Yours" was fully written and directed by LaRosa herself.

Discography

Extended plays

Singles

Songwriting credits

References 

Living people
Singer-songwriters from Maryland
2004 births